Elísio Muondo Dala (born October 3, 1980) is a retired Angolan football player. He has played for Angola national team.

He is the older brother of Gelson Dala.

National team statistics

References

1980 births
Living people
Angolan footballers
C.D. Primeiro de Agosto players
Angola international footballers
Association football defenders